was a lolicon hentai manga magazine published by Byakuya Shobo in Tokyo from 1982 to 1985 in Japan. The magazine was launched as a competitor to Lemon People, but it only lasted three years. The manga in the magazine were generally bishōjo and lolita manga which were mostly science fiction, parody, shōjo manga-style, anime-related, idol star related, and anything otaku related.  In response to reader demand, Manga Burikko removed nude photographs of girls and explicit sex from its contents.

The term "otaku" was coined by Akio Nakamori in his short-lived "Otaku Research" (Otaku no kenkyuu) column in the magazine.

Other competing adult manga magazines include Manga Hot Milk, Melon Comic, and Monthly Halflita.

Most of the editors and contributors to the Petit Apple Pie manga anthology series also worked on (or published in) Manga Burikko. However, unlike the content in Manga Burikko, the Petit Apple Pie stories do not contain any erotic or pornographic material.

Manga artists published
Manga artists who have had their works published in Manga Burikko include:

Kamui Fujiwara
Juan Gotō
Yoshitō Asari (Asakari Yoshito)
Miki Hayasaka
Haruhiko Masuda
Nonki Miyasu
Aki Nakata
Kyoko Okazaki
Eiji Ōtsuka
Erica Sakurazawa
Yumi Shirakura
Kentaro Takekuma

References

External links
 

1982 establishments in Japan
1985 disestablishments in Japan
Defunct magazines published in Japan
Erotica magazines published in Japan
Lolicon
Magazines established in 1982
Magazines disestablished in 1985
Men's magazines published in Japan
Monthly manga magazines published in Japan
Pornographic manga magazines
Magazines published in Tokyo